The 26th Artillery Brigade is an artillery formation of the Ukrainian Ground Forces, based in Berdychiv. It traces its history to the 117th Guards Rifle Division of the Second World War.

After the war, and several redesignations, the 117th Guards Rifle Division became the 117th Guards Tank Training Division. After the collapse of the Soviet Union, the 117th Guards Tank Training Division was succeeded by the 62nd Mechanized Brigade, which, in turn, was created 26th Artillery Brigade (based on the Directive of the Ministry of Defense of Ukraine from 18.06.2004 № 312/1/014).

The brigade is operating Panzerhaubitze 2000 self-propelled howitzers gifted by Germany and the Netherlands during the 2022 Russian invasion of Ukraine, artillery used in the Battle of Bakhmut.

Cold War 
In 1945, the 117th Guards Rifle Division became the 32nd Guards Mechanized Division. It moved to Berdichev and later became part of the 8th Mechanized Army.

On 4 June 1957, the division was converted into the 41st Guards Tank Division and the army became the 8th Tank Army. The 76th Separate Tank Training Battalion was disbanded in 1960. On 19 February 1962, the 685th Separate Missile Battalion and 437th Separate Equipment Maintenance and Recovery Battalion were activated. On 11 January 1965, the division was renamed the 117th Guards Tank Division, restoring its World War II number. In 1968, the 129th Separate Guards Sapper Battalion became an engineer-sapper unit. On 1 November of that year, the division became a training tank division and was directly subordinated to the Carpathian Military District. On 1 September 1987, it became the 119th Guards District Training Center.

On 1 December 2000, the training center was disbanded, and its units used to form the 62nd Mechanized Brigade. In 2004, the brigade was converted into the 26th Artillery Brigade.

Current Structure 
As of 2017 the brigade's structure is as follows:

 26th Artillery Brigade, Berdychiv
 Headquarters & Headquarters Battery
 1st Self-propelled Artillery Battalion (2S19 Msta-S)
 2nd Self-propelled Artillery Battalion (2S19 Msta-S)
 3rd Self-propelled Artillery Battalion (2S5 Giatsint-S)
 4th Anti-tank Artillery Battalion (MT-12 Rapira)
 Artillery Reconnaissance Battalion
 14th Motorized Infantry Battalion "Cherkasy"
 Engineer Company
 Maintenance Company
 Logistic Company
 CBRN-defense Platoon

References

Michael Holm, 117th Guards Tank Division, 2015.

Artillery brigades of Ukraine
Military units and formations established in 2004
Military units and formations of the 2022 Russian invasion of Ukraine